Euphemia LatiQue Sumpter (born June 20, 1980), better known as Tika Sumpter, is an American actress, singer, producer, television host, and model. Sumpter began her career as the host of Best Friend's Date. From 2005 to 2010, she appeared in the daytime soap opera, One Life to Live. In 2010, she made her film debut in Stomp the Yard: Homecoming.

Sumpter was later featured in supporting roles for What's Your Number?, Think Like a Man, Sparkle, and A Madea Christmas. From 2013 to 2021, she appeared on the OWN soap opera The Haves and the Have Nots, as well as in Ride Along, Ride Along 2, Get On Up, and Nobody's Fool. In 2016, she starred as Michelle Robinson in Southside with You. In 2020, she appeared in Sonic the Hedgehog and reprised her role in the 2022 sequel, Sonic the Hedgehog 2.

Early life 
Sumpter was born in 1980 in Queens, New York City. She was a cheerleader at her high school. She graduated from Longwood Senior High School in Middle Island, New York and studied at Marymount Manhattan College where she majored in communications.

Career

2004–2011
Sumpter began her modeling career and appeared in commercials for Hewlett-Packard and Liz Claiborne's Curve fragrances. She also worked as a waitress before acting. In 2004, she served as the co-host for the reality series Best Friend's Date, which was broadcast on Nickelodeon's defunct cable channel The N, now titled TeenNick. The following year she landed the role of Layla Williamson in the ABC daytime soap opera, One Life to Live. For her portrayal of Layla, Sumpter was nominated for an NAACP Image Award for Best Actress in a Daytime Drama Series in 2008. She first appeared on-screen on July 15, 2005, playing the role regularly through September 14, 2010. Sumpter reappeared in the role on November 9–10, 2010, and January 21 and 24, 2011.

In 2010, Sumpter made her film debut in Stomp the Yard: Homecoming and briefly appeared in Salt. From January to May 2011, Sumpter appeared in The CW teen drama series, Gossip Girl as Raina Thorpe. She played singer Jason Derülo's girlfriend in the video for his song "It Girl". In 2011, she appeared in the romantic comedy film What's Your Number?. From 2011 to 2012 she also had a recurring role as Jenna Rice in the BET comedy series, The Game.

2012–2015
Sumpter played Delores "Dee" Anderson in the musical-drama Sparkle (2012), inspired by the story of The Supremes. Sumpter is heard on the Sparkle: Original Motion Picture Soundtrack, and appears in the music video for "Celebrate".

After Sparkle, she starred in the independent comedy film My Man Is a Loser. From May 2013 to July 2021, Sumpter starred as Candace Young, a lead villainess, in the Oprah Winfrey Network soap opera The Haves and the Have Nots. The series was a hit for the Oprah Winfrey Network. In 2013, she also appeared in A Madea Christmas.

In 2014, Sumpter co-starred in Ride Along, opposite Kevin Hart and Ice Cube. She reprised her role in the 2016 sequel Ride Along 2. She played Yvonne Fair in Get On Up, the biographical drama film about James Brown. In the same year she co-starred opposite Queen Latifah, Mo'Nique, and Khandi Alexander in the HBO biographical film Bessie about the blues singer Bessie Smith.

2016–present
Sumpter played a young Michelle Robinson in the film Southside with You, a biopic about the early romance between Barack and Michelle Obama. The film premiered at the 2016 Sundance Film Festival and received positive reviews from critics. Sumpter also co-produced the film.

Sumpter is an honorary member of Alpha Kappa Alpha sorority.  She was inducted into the organization on July 10, 2016, at the 67th annual Boule, in Atlanta, Georgia.

In 2018, Sumpter appeared in the drama The Old Man & the Gun, directed by David Lowery. She also appeared in An Acceptable Loss, a political thriller written and directed by Joe Chappelle, and in the comedy-drama film Nobody's Fool for Paramount Players.

In 2019, Sumpter was cast in the ABC comedy series Mixed-ish, a prequel spinoff of Black-ish, playing the role of Alicia, Rainbow's mother. In 2020, she appeared in the film Sonic the Hedgehog based on the video game franchise, and in the 2022 sequel.

Personal life
On October 8, 2016, Sumpter gave birth to her daughter, Ella-Loren. In January 2017, Sumpter announced that she was engaged to The Haves and the Have Nots co-star, Nicholas James. The couple married in 2022.

Filmography

Film

Television

Video games

References

External links

 

21st-century American actresses
Actresses from New York City
African-American female models
Living people
Marymount Manhattan College alumni
Singers from New York City
American television actresses
African-American actresses
American film actresses
American soap opera actresses
People from Queens, New York
21st-century American singers
20th-century African-American women singers
21st-century African-American women
1980 births